Swaminarayan Akshardham in Gandhinagar, Gujarat, India is a large Hindu temple complex inspired by Yogiji Maharaj (1892–1971) the fourth spiritual successor of Swaminarayan, and created by Pramukh Swami Maharaj (1921–2016), the fifth spiritual successor of Swaminarayan according to the BAPS denomination of Swaminarayan Hinduism. Located in the capital of Gujarat, the complex was built over 13 years and is a tribute to Swaminarayan and his life and teachings. At the center of the 23-acre complex is the Akshardham mandir, which is built from 6,000 metric tons of pink sandstone from Rajasthan. The complex's name refers to the divine abode of Swaminarayan in the BAPS philosophy; followers of Swaminarayan believe that the jiva or soul goes to Akshardham after attaining moksha, or liberation. BAPS followers worship Swaminarayan as God almighty.

Akshardham Mandir
The focal point of the complex is the Akshardham Mandir, which measures 108 feet high, 131 feet wide and 240 feet long and features 97 carved pillars, 17 domes, 8 balconies, 220 stone beams and 264 sculpted figures. In accordance with Vedic architectural principles, no steel or iron has been used anywhere in the mandir. 20 foot-long stone beams, each weighing five tons, have been used as load-bearing support throughout the mandir.
The mandir's central chamber houses a seven-foot-tall, gold-leafed murti, or sacred image, of Swaminarayan, who is worshipped by followers as God. The murti rests upon a three-foot pedestal and weighs 1.2 tons. It is flanked by the murtis of the ideal devotee, Aksharbrahma Gunatitanand Swami and Aksharmukta Goplanand Swami, both in postures of loving devotion toward Swaminarayan. In each of the four corners of the mandir sits a life-sized marble murti of the lineages of gurus or successors of Swaminarayan revered by BAPS. The first floor of the mandir is known as the Vibhuti Mandapam and features lotus-shaped displays describing the spiritual character of Swaminarayan, while the basement of the mandir, called the Prasadi Mandapam, houses a historical display of various sacred relics from Swaminarayan's life.

Abhishek Mandapam
The complex houses an Abhishek Mandapam an area designated for all visitors to perform abhishek on the murti of Neelkanth Varni - a yogic form of Swaminarayan. The murti of Neelkanth Varni was consecrated in 2014 by Pramukh Swami and the Abhishek Mandapam was inaugurated on 14 December 2015 by Mahant Swami, the sixth spiritual successor  of Lord Swaminarayan according to the denomination of Swaminarayan Hinduism. The abhishek ritual begins with the tying of a Kalava, a sacred Hindu thread, on the visitor's wrist along with the recitation of Hindu shlokas. Following the tying of the thread, the visitors bath the murti of Neelkanth Varni with a small pot of sanctified water. While the murti is bathed, visitors are encouraged to pray for their personal wishes.

Exhibition Halls
The complex's five exhibition halls use audio-visual presentations and life-sized dioramas to explore various themes in Hinduism. The Neelkanth and Sahajannd Halls depict Swaminarayan's life, work and teachings. The Mystic India Hall features an IMAX theater which screens a 40-minute film portraying the country-spanning pilgrimage Swaminarayan had embarked on at the age of eleven, when he assumed the name Neelkanth Varni. The film, directed by Keith Melton and narrated by Peter O’Toole, was shot at 108 locations across India and boasts a cast of over 45,000 people. It has received numerous plaudits including the Audience's Choice Award at the 10th International Large Format Film Festival at La Geode in Paris, France and the "Most Popular Film" at the San Jose IMAX Film Festival. The Premanand Hall is divided into three sub-sections, the first is dedicated to the Hindu scriptural texts, the Upanishads, the Ramayana, and the Mahabharata; the second explores religions more generally and features photographic displays of the symbols, scriptures, sacred sites, moral codes and prayers of the world's major faiths; and the third section serves as a tribute to some of India's most famous poets. The fifth exhibition hall, Sant Param Hitakari, houses an audio-animatronics show conveying a message of everlasting happiness.

Sat-Chit-Anand Water Show
The Sat-Chit-Anand Water Show is an interpretative performance of the parable of Nachiketa, as told in the Kathopanishad. The show's title translates to Truth-Knowledge-Bliss and is an appellation of the Hindu ontological reality Aksharbrahma or Akshardham. The show was inaugurated on 3 April 2010 by Pramukh Swami.
The vibrant show employs fire, fountain animations, laser, water screen projections, music and live characters in a 45-minute retelling of Nachiketa's choice.  Nachiketa was the son of a rishi named Udalaka, who organized a yagna in which he gifted sickly, barren cattle to Brahmin attendees. Nachiketa was troubled by his father's deception and asked to whom he himself would be offered to in charity. Angered by this question, Udalaka banished Nachiketa to the realm of Yamapuri, the underworld. Nachiketa stood at Yama's doorstep for three days waiting for Yama's arrival; Yama was impressed by Nachiketa's resoluteness, and offered him three boons. Firstly, Nachiketa requested that his father may welcome him lovingly upon his return home; next that he be granted the knowledge by which he can be worthy of living in the heavens; and lastly he may attain knowledge of the eternal soul, the Atma, which transcends death. The story of Nachiketa offers lessons in realizing one's true Self, living by one's principles, perseverance in the face of difficulties, and keeping spiritual perspective in any circumstance.

AARSH (Akshardham Centre for Applied Research in Social Harmony)
AARSH is a research  institute focused on the Swaminarayan tradition as well as the role of Hindu principles in solving social problems. It serves as a forum for scholars to discuss pragmatic application of religion and philosophy to raise social harmony in society  The research facility includes a library of more than 7,000 works in Sanskrit, Hindi, Gujarati and Tamil as well as a large collection of rare manuscripts that cover the various denominations and schools of philosophy in Hinduism. AARSH regularly hosts academic conferences; past events include the Sanskrit Scholars’ Conference, the Sanskrit Journalists’ Conference, the Saints Poets Conference and the National Conference on Vaidikatva. AARSH, led by its director, Dr. Shrutiprakash Swami, is an independent research institute affiliated with Shree Somnath Sanskrit University in Veraval, Gujarat.

Sahajanand Van
Sahajanand Van is a 15-acre garden with various attractions, including rock arrangements, fountains, a waterfall, and an 18,000 sq. ft. plant nursery. In addition, throughout the garden are six cultural wisdom spots which depict specific incidents and teachings of Hinduism. 
The first spot is a marble sculpture which depicts Swaminarayan on his favourite mare, Manki. Swaminarayan traveled in Gujarat on horseback, visiting villages and homes of devotees. Manki's love and emotion for Swaminarayan is notable. The second spot is a sculpture depicting Vishnu on the coils of the multi-headed serpent, Shesha. At Vishnu's side is Lakshmi, his choicest devotee. This spot expresses the role of the ideal devotee – to remain eternally in the service of God. The third spot is the Surya Ratha, which depicts the Sun Chariot being drawn by seven stallions. Indian culture honors the Sun for it is the provider of light, energy and life. The fourth spot is the Samudra Manthana, which depicts the churning of the ocean, through a joint effort between the devas and the asuras, in the search for the nectar of immortality, or amrita. Before amrita was discovered, a lethal poison was churned out. Shiva came to the rescue and saved the world from destruction. The fifth spot depicts the holy rivers of Ganga, Yamuna, and Saraswati. Along the banks of these rivers, Hindu culture has flourished.
The sixth spot is Lake Narayan Sarovar. At the center of the lake is a 20-foot fountain.

Sahajanand Van also hosts an open air assembly ground with a seating capacity of 9,000. This area is used for cultural programs and festivals.
Also within Sahajanand Van is a vegetarian restaurant titled, Premvati, serving Indian cuisine with regional choices.

Construction and opening
The foundation stone-laying ceremony for the Akshardham mandir was conducted by Pramukh Swami on 14 December 1979, and the foundation was completed in 1981.
Artisans skilled in stonework prepared the stones used in the Akshardham mandir; the process consisted of smoothing, contouring, detailing and polishing. Smoothing entails chiseling the hewn stone into smaller pieces; contouring involves stenciling the bare designs onto stone, and to give approximate contours  to the stone; the artisans use chisels to detail the designs and figurines into stone; and finally, emery is used to file and polish the stone to a smooth finish.
While the mandir structure itself was completed in 1985, the concepts and designs for the exhibition halls were developed over the next three years and work on the exhibitions and colonnade began in 1988. The completed complex was inaugurated on 4 November 1992.

Terror attack

On 24 September 2002, two armed terrorists attacked Akshardham, killing 33 people and wounding 70. The Indian National Security Guard intervened and ended the siege by killing both terrorists. A prayer assembly led by Pramukh Swami was organized for 29 September 2002, with attendees praying for the departed souls and their families and also for communal and sectarian peace. More than 30,000 people attended assembly. The Akshardham complex was reopened fourteen days after the attack. Pramukh Swami's peaceful response to the incident from beginning to end has been termed by a brigadier general involved in the operation as the "Akshardham Response" and described as a model to be emulated to maintain peace and harmony in society.

See also
Swaminarayan Akshardham (New Delhi)
Swaminarayan Akshardham (New Jersey)
Swaminarayan Temple, Ahmedabad
2002 Akshardham attack

References

External links
Akshardham Gandhinagar Website
Akshardham Delhi Website
BAPS Swaminarayan Sanstha (Organization responsible for the creation of Akshardham)
BAPS Charities (Charitable arm of BAPS responsible for part of the complex)

Swaminarayan temples in Gujarat
Vishnu temples
Gandhinagar
Hindu temples in Ahmedabad
Religious buildings and structures completed in 1992
1992 establishments in Gujarat
20th-century architecture in India